A quasi alliance is a relationship between two states that have not formed an alliance despite sharing a common ally. These two states may remain unallied due to alliance hindrances such as historical animosity, but still share a common, powerful ally capable of diminishing the two states' security fears due to a common threat.

Japan-Korea relations may be referred to as a quasi alliance, as the two states remain unallied, but share a common threat, North Korea, and a common ally, the United States. The two states remain unallied mainly due to historical animosity rooting from the period of Japanese colonialism.

References 

Treaties by type